The 1989 West Coast Athletic Conference men's basketball tournament was held  at War Memorial Gymnasium on the campus of the University of San Francisco in San Francisco,  This was the third edition of the tournament and the last as the WCAC; the conference name was shortened to "West Coast Conference" (WCC) that summer.

The fourth-seed and host Dons lost in the quarterfinals and the top two seeds were defeated in the  Third-seeded Loyola Marymount defeated #5 seed   (in overtime) in the title game to repeat as WCAC tournament 

The Lions earned the automatic bid to the 64-team NCAA tournament and were seeded twelfth in the Midwest regional. Regular-season champion Saint Mary's received an at-large bid and were the eighth seed in the West regional; both WCAC teams lost in the first round.

Bracket
* – Denotes overtime period

References

West Coast Conference men's basketball tournament
Tournament
West Coast Athletic Conference men's basketball tournament
West Coast Athletic Conference men's basketball tournament